The TV-Computer (or TVC in short) is an 8-bit home computer which was manufactured by the Hungarian company Videoton around 1986. The computer was based on the Enterprise and had a built-in BASIC interpreter. Programs could be loaded via tape or floppy. It had a built-in joystick and a keyboard with Hungarian letters and nine function keys.

There are three different models of the TVC:
 32k which has 32 Kb of RAM
 64k which has 64 Kb of RAM
 64k+ which has 64 Kb of RAM and a newer BASIC interpreter (v2.2) and more video RAM (64 Kb instead of 16 Kb)

The TVC has three graphical modes: 128×240/16 colors, 256×240/4 colors, and 512×240/2 colors (black and white). Few programs existed for the computer. Many of these were written by dedicated amateurs and were distributed by mail.

References 

Home computers
Science and technology in Hungary